Leonetti is a surname of Italian origin. People with that name include:

Caroline Leonetti Ahmanson (1918-2005), American fashion consultant, businesswoman and philanthropist
Francesco Leonetti ( - 2017), Italian poet, novelist teacher and political activist
Giovanni Battista Leonetti (19th century), Italian engraver
Joey Leonetti (born 1970), American soccer player
John R. Leonetti (born 1956), American cinematographer
Matthew F. Leonetti (born 1941), American cinematographer
Melissa Leonetti (born 1982), American field hockey player
Phil Leonetti (born 1953), American mobster
Tommy Leonetti (1929-1979), American singer-songwriter and actor

Surnames of Italian origin